KDIC may refer to:

 KDIC (88.5 FM), a defunct radio station formerly licensed to serve Grinnell, Iowa, United States
 Korea Deposit Insurance Corporation, South Korea
 Kenya Deposit Insurance Corporation